The King's Own Scottish Borderers Football Club was the association football team of the 1st battalion of the King's Own Scottish Borderers. While deployed at the Victoria Barracks, Belfast the team played in the Irish Football League for the 1903–04 season. Previously, the battalion had been resident in Dublin, where it played in the Leinster Senior League.

Honours

In British Raj
Durand Cup
Winners (2): 1891, 1892
IFA Shield
Runners-up (2): 1903, 1941

Notes

References

Defunct association football clubs in Northern Ireland
Defunct Irish Football League clubs
Association football clubs in Belfast
Former senior Irish Football League clubs
Association football in the British Army
Military football clubs in Northern Ireland